The 2008 Fifth Third Bank Tennis Championships was a professional tennis tournament played on Hard court. It was a fourteenth edition of the tournament which was part of the 2008 ATP Challenger Series. It took place in Lexington, Kentucky, United States between 21 and 27 July 2008.

Singles entrants

Seeds

 Rankings are as of July 14, 2008.

Other entrants
The following players received wildcards into the singles main draw:
  Chase Buchanan
  Amer Delić
  Bryan Koniecko
  Rhyne Williams

The following players received entry from the qualifying draw:
  Somdev Devvarman
  Alberto Francis
  Justin O'Neal
  Rylan Rizza

The following players received entry by special exempt:
  Érik Chvojka
  Toshihide Matsui

Champions

Men's singles 

  Somdev Devvarman def.  Robert Kendrick 6–3, 6–3

Men's doubles 

  Alessandro da Col /  Andrea Stoppini def.  Olivier Charroin /  Érik Chvojka 6–2, 2–6, [10–8]

References
Steve G Tennis

Fifth Third Bank Tennis Championships
2008